Mamiku is a town on the island of Saint Lucia; it is located on the eastern coast, near Mon Repos.

Towns in Saint Lucia